The Cathedral of The Most Holy Trinity, popularly known as "Templo Inglés", is an Anglican church in Montevideo, Uruguay.

Overview
The original temple dates back to the 1830s and was built directly on the seashore. It was made possible through the sole effort of Samuel Fisher Lafone.

At the beginning of the 20th century it was re-built on its current location, due to the modern development of the Rambla of Montevideo.

It is the cathedral of the Uruguayan diocese of the Anglican Church of the Southern Cone of America.

Bibliography
 Guía Arquitectónica y Urbanística de Montevideo. 3rd edition. Intendencia Municipal de Montevideo, 2008, page 32.

See also
 List of cathedrals in Uruguay
 British people in Uruguay

References

External links

Anglican Church in Uruguay 

Ciudad Vieja, Montevideo
Church buildings in Montevideo
Anglican cathedrals in South America
Cathedrals in Uruguay
British immigration to Uruguay